Big Spender is a United States reality television series on the A&E Network. Host Larry Winget visits people in financial crisis, then advises them how to solve the problems and avoid repeating the same mistakes. The show is produced by NorthSouth Productions and premiered in July 2006.

All episodes show:
 Winget visiting the individual(s) in crisis and assessing the situation
 An analysis of the elements in the financial crisis (e.g., consumer debt, overspending)
 A "contract" of required changes, which the individual(s) must discuss and sign
 Scenes of the individual(s) following or departing from the agreed-upon changes
 A return visit from Winget to examine whether the recommended changes were made

A writer for The Arizona Republic described Winget's style as "blunt" and "quite funny." Discussing Big Spender, the writer noted, "Every Saturday night, he can be seen berating people who make lousy financial choices." Another reviewer lauded the educational information, but said Winget "uses a form of tough love that is verbally harsh, caustic, and confrontational" and expressed the opinion that psychological counseling was a missing element from the show.

Winget has commented on the difficulty of finding participants willing to expose their financial difficulties on national television. The first season's participants all were drawn from the south Florida area, but producers planned to recruit nationally for the second season.

The show lasted only one season.

References

External links
 

A&E (TV network) original programming
2000s American reality television series
2006 American television series debuts
English-language television shows
2006 American television series endings